Tommy Mills  (date of death unknown) was a Welsh international footballer forward. He was part of the Wales national football team between 1933 and 1934, playing 4 matches. He played his first match on 4 November 1933 against Ireland and his last match on 21  November 1934 against Scotland. On club level he played for Bristol Rovers F.C. between 1936 and 1939, playing 99 matches and scoring 17 goals.

See also
 List of Wales international footballers (alphabetical)

References

1911 births
Welsh footballers
Wales international footballers
Bristol Rovers F.C. players
English Football League players
Place of birth missing
Year of death missing
Association football forwards